The Roman Catholic Diocese of Eisenstadt is a diocese located in the city of Eisenstadt in the Ecclesiastical province of Vienna in Austria. The episcopal seat is in Eisenstadt Cathedral.

History
 May 18, 1922: Established as Apostolic Administration of Burgenland from the Diocese of Győr, Hungary and Diocese of Szombathely, Hungary 
 August 15, 1960: Promoted to Diocese of Eisenstadt

Special churches

 Minor Basilicas:
 Basilica of Maria Loretto, Loretto, Burgenland 
 Church of the Ascension of the Blessed Virgin Mary (Mariä Himmelfahrt), Frauenkirchen, Burgenland

Leadership
 Bishops of Eisenstadt (Roman rite)
 Bishop Ägidius Zsifkovics (proclaimed 2010.07.09)
 Bishop Paul Iby (1992.12.28 – 2010.07.09)
 Bishop Štefan László (1960.08.15 – 1992.12.28)
 Apostolic Administrators of Burgenland (Roman rite) 
 Bishop Štefan László (1954.01.30 – 1960.08.15)
 Archbishop Josef Schoiswohl (1949.11.11 – 1954.01.18)
 Cardinal Theodor Innitzer (1932 – 1949.11.11)
 Cardinal Friedrich Gustav Piffl, C.R.S.A. (1922 – 1932.04.21)

See also
 Roman Catholicism in Austria
 List of Roman Catholic dioceses in Austria

References

External links
 GCatholic.org 
 Catholic Hierarchy 
  Diocese website

Eisenstadt
Roman Catholic Diocese of Eisenstadt
Christian organizations established in 1922
Roman Catholic dioceses and prelatures established in the 20th century
Eisenstadt, Roman Catholic Diocese of